The Residences is a complex of 18 residential towers in the Downtown Dubai development in Dubai, United Arab Emirates. Ten have been completed and eight more were under construction but have been canceled.

Towers
The complex was originally to consists of 18 skyscrapers, only 10 have been built.

Completed

Cancelled

* Entries without data indicate that information regarding the height has not yet been released.

See also
 List of tallest buildings in Dubai

References

External links
 The Residences on Emporis.com

Proposed skyscrapers in Dubai
Residential skyscrapers in Dubai